Andrew Louw may refer to:

 Andrew Louw (cricketer) (born 2000), South African cricketer
 Andrew Louw (umpire) (born 1987), Namibian cricket umpire
 Andrew Louw (politician) (born 1969), South African politician